Field lupine is a common name for several lupines and may refer to:

Lupinus albus, native to the Mediterranean region and cultivated for its edible seeds
Lupinus nanus, native to the western United States